Fakirbhudihal is a village in Bagalkot district (Badami Taluka) Karnataka state of India. It is near Badami.

References

See also
 Pattadakal
 Mahakuta
 Aihole
 Gajendragad
 Sudi
 North Karnataka

Villages in Bagalkot district